Fadak (also known as Fadūk and Fadvak) is a village in Bala Khaf Rural District, Salami District, Khaf County, Razavi Khorasan Province, Iran. At the 2006 census, its population was 189, in 55 families.

References 

Populated places in Khaf County